Yatta may refer to:

 Yatta, Hebron, a Palestinian city
 Yatta Constituency, an electoral constituency in Kenya
 Yatta Plateau, Tsavo East National Park, Kenya
 "Yatta" (song), a 2001 Japanese parody song

See also
 Yada
 Yada Yada
 Yotta-
Yottabyte for instance